The Washington D.C. Area Film Critics Association Award for Best Actor is one of the annual awards given by the Washington D.C. Area Film Critics Association.

Winners and nominees

2000s

2010s

2020s

Actor, Best
Film awards for lead actor